Aadchit Al Qusayr, or simply Aadchit, is a village in the Marjeyoun District in South Lebanon.

Name
According to E. H. Palmer, the name Atshis comes from a personal name.

History
In 1881, the PEF's Survey of Western Palestine (SWP) described it: "a small village, built of mud and stone, containing about 100 Metawileh, situated on a low ridge surrounded by small gardens and olives. The water supply is from four rock-cut cisterns."

References

Bibliography

External links 
  Aadchit (Qoussair), Localiban
Survey of Western Palestine, Map 2:  IAA, Wikimedia commons

Populated places in Marjeyoun District
Shia Muslim communities in Lebanon